Xiaoba is a town under the administration of Qixingguan District, Bijie, Guizhou, China. , it has 4 residential communities and 5 villages under its administration.

References 

Township-level divisions of Guizhou
Bijie